This page lists the major power stations located in Xinjiang.

Non-renewable

Coal-based

Renewable

Hydroelectric

Conventional

Pumped-storage

Solar

References 

Xinjiang
Power stations